Elections to the French National Assembly were held in Gabon and French Congo on 2 January 1956.

Results

First college

Second college: Gabon

Second College: Moyen Congo

References

Gabon
Elections in Gabon
Elections in the Republic of the Congo
1956 in Gabon
1956 in Moyen-Congo
Election and referendum articles with incomplete results